Philip II, Count of Nassau-Wiesbaden (1516 – 3 January 1566 in Wiesbaden-Sonnenberg) was the eldest son of Philip I and his wife, Adriana of Glymes of Bergen.  He succeeded his father as Count of Nassau-Wiesbaden and Nassau-Idstein in 1558.

He died unmarried and childless in 1566, and was succeeded as Count of Nassau-Wiesbaden-Idstein by his younger brother Balthasar.

House of Nassau
Counts of Nassau
1516 births
1566 deaths
16th-century German people
Counts of Nassau-Wiesbaden-Idstein